The 2009 Orange CECAFA Senior Challenge tournament was the 33rd edition of the CECAFA Cup football tournament that involves teams from East and Central Africa. The 2009 edition was hosted in Kenya.

Participants

Notes:

Information

Sudan was left out due to missing the deadline for the draw.

French telecommunications company Orange agreed to sponsor the tournament. Orange paid $175,000 USD for the privilege.

The Kenyan Government also paid $80,000 USD to sponsor the tournament. It is the first time in 15 years that the CECAFA Cup has been hosted in Kenya.

CECAFA unveiled tournament mascot Tembo, a friendly looking elephant in a black- and yellow-stripped jersey and orange shorts, standing with his left foot on a football. Tembo will spread the message "Uniting for Peace", the tournament's theme.

Television rights were sold to Kenya Broadcasting Corporation in partnership with South-African owned Super Sport.

Group stage
All times are East Africa Time (EAT) – UTC+3

Group A

Group B

Group C

Knockout stage
All times are East Africa Time (EAT) – UTC+3

Quarter-finals

Semi-finals

Third place play-off

Final

Eritreans seek refugee status
Following Eritrea's exit from the competition, the Eritrean national football team sought refugee status in Nairobi and then leave to Australia.

Goalscorers
5 goals
 Mrisho Ngassa

4 goals
 Yusuf Ndayishime

3 goals
 James Chamanga
 Kennedy Chola

2 goals

 Umed Ukuri
 Allan Wanga
 Tumayine Ndamuhanga
 Dan Wagaluka
 Charles Siyingwa

1 goal

 Isaias Andberhian
 Testfaldet Goitom
 Filmon Tseqay
 Aklilu Ayenew
 Adane Girma
 Tefesse Tesfaye
 John Baraza
 George Odhiambo
 Haruna Niyonzima
 Mafisango Mutesa
 Mohamed Hassan Ali
 Musa Mugosi
 Stephen Bengo
 Owen Kasule
 Geoffrey Massa
 Emmanuel Okwi
 Mike Sserumaga
 Robert Ssentongo
 Felix Sunzu
 Abdulla Abdulghani
 Abdi Kassim
 Aggrey Morris
 Mangezi Tapiwa
 Zhokinyi Guthrie
 Lionel Mutizwa

Own goal

 Hassan Hakizimana (for Zanzibar)
 Henry Mbazumutima (for Zanzibar)
 Ermias Wolday (for Rwanda)
 Moalim Bader (for Rwanda)
 Yassin Ali Egal (for Eritrea)
 Abdoulahi Hamoud (for Uganda)

References

External links
Official Site

2009
CECAFA Cup
CECAFA Cup
International association football competitions hosted by Kenya